Ching Ling Foo was the stage name of the Chinese magician Chee Ling Qua (1854–1922). He is credited with being the first modern East Asian magician to achieve world fame.

Biography 

Ching Ling Foo was born in Beijing on May 11, 1854, He studied traditional Chinese magic and was a well-respected performer in his homeland.

During a typical performance, he stunned the audience by breathing smoke and fire or producing ribbons and a  pole from his mouth. One of his sensational tricks had Foo using a sword to cut the head of a serving boy off at the shoulders. Then, to the amazement of the audience, the “beheaded” boy turns and exits the stage.

Another trick involved producing a huge bowl, full to the brim with water, from out of an empty cloth. He would then pull a small child from the bowl.  When he brought his show to the United States in 1898, he began offering a $1,000 reward to anyone who could reproduce his water trick. (This was quite a large sum for the time, equivalent to about $33,050 in 2021.)

New York-born William Robinson, who worked occasionally as a magician, decided to try for the $1,000. Foo rebuffed him. Unable to claim the $1,000, Robinson developed a Chinese-style show of his own and recreated himself as Chung Ling Soo. Robinson, in the guise of Soo, traveled to Europe and a deep rivalry was begun between the two men.

A group of Chinese women with bound feet, including Foo's wife, accompanied the magician outside China and was shown as another attraction. Other members of Foo's family would also participate in his act. He would often conjure his daughter, Chee Toy, onto the stage while his son would perform acrobatics and juggling.

Ching Ling Foo died in Shanghai in 1922, aged 69 years.

In popular culture

Music 
Irving Berlin included him in his lyrics for “From Here to Shanghai” (1917)

"I'll eat the way they do,
With a pair of wooden sticks,
And I'll have Ching Ling Foo,
Doing all his magic tricks."

Film 
Christopher Nolan’s The Prestige—about two warring stage conjurers—depicts a Chinese magician working in London, who performs a trick with a water bowl similar to one of Foo's stunts.

References

External links

1854 births
1922 deaths
Vaudeville performers
Chinese magicians
People from Beijing